Mary Rhodes Russell (born July 28, 1958) is a judge of the Supreme Court of Missouri. She served a two-year term as chief justice from July 2013 through June 2015. She was appointed to the Supreme Court in 2004 by Governor Bob Holden.

In 1980 she graduated summa cum laude from Northeast Missouri State University and received her Juris Doctor degree in 1983 from the University of Missouri. She served as a law clerk for George Gunn at the Supreme Court of Missouri, before entering private practice in Hannibal, Missouri.

She served on the Missouri Court of Appeals, Eastern District, from 1994 to 2004 and served as chief judge from 1999 to 2000.

References

External links
 Mary Rhodes Russell on the Missouri Supreme Court website

|-

|-

1958 births
Living people
Missouri Court of Appeals judges
People from Hannibal, Missouri
Judges of the Supreme Court of Missouri
Truman State University alumni
University of Missouri School of Law alumni
Women in Missouri politics
Chief Justices of the Supreme Court of Missouri
21st-century American judges
Women chief justices of state supreme courts in the United States
21st-century American women judges